The Pyramids are three 11-story, pyramid-shaped office buildings that are part of a  commercial development in College Park, Indianapolis, Indiana, United States. The structures occupy  of land situated next to a  lake. They were constructed between 1967 and 1972 by the College Life Insurance Company (now part of Americo Life) using a design by architect Kevin Roche. They are noted for the abstract quality of the opacity of the concrete walls that face the nearby highway and the reflectivity of the glass curtain walls that face the landscaped grounds.

History
In the 1960s, the College Life Insurance Company was rapidly expanding and sought to accommodate its growing staff while providing for anticipated expansion. It decided on a plan by Kevin Roche consisting of nine identical office towers each eleven stories tall and each containing . This would permit it to build towers as it needed additional office space without leaving buildings idle or underused. Only the initial three towers were constructed and take the form of pyramids. In the late 1990s the site was re-landscaped and further construction of towers appears unlikely. In 2004, Sterling American Property purchased the office center for US$10 million.

Since they were originally constructed, the College Life Insurance Company has left the buildings. Purchased in 2022, the property is owned by Speedway, Indiana-based KennMar LLC, which rents space to various businesses in the Indianapolis area. They are also noted as being among Roche's best works and contributed to his being awarded the Pritzker Prize. In 2021, a six-person panel of American Institute of Architects (AIA) Indianapolis members identified The Pyramids among the ten most "architecturally significant" buildings completed in the city since World War II.

Structure
Each tower is made up of two walls of reinforced concrete from which project the unobstructed office floors. Those concrete walls provide the support for the floors as well as serving as L-shaped service cores. The other two walls are covered in blue exterior glass and each building is connected to the others via underground and above-ground passages. Each pyramid has three cable passenger elevators. The buildings have been described as "abstract" and "sculptural" based on their use of opaque concrete walls facing the nearby highway and reflective blue glass facing the interior lake of the complex.

References

External links

The official site of The Pyramids
The Pyramids at Skyscraper Page
The Pyramids at Emporis
KennMar - owner and manager of The Pyramids

Skyscraper office buildings in Indianapolis
Office buildings completed in 1972
Roche-Dinkeloo buildings
Pyramids in the United States
Futurist architecture
1972 establishments in Indiana